Pir Mujeeb ul Haq is a Pakistani politician who had been a Member of the Provincial Assembly of Sindh, from May 2013 to May 2018.

Early life and education

He was born to Pir Mazhar Ul Haq Ex-Senior minister of Sindh on 16 May 1978 in Dadu.

He has a degree of Bachelor of Laws from University of Kent.

Political career

He was elected to the Provincial Assembly of Sindh as a candidate of Pakistan Peoples Party (PPP) from Constituency PS-74 DADU-I in 2013 Pakistani general election.

He was re-elected to Provincial Assembly of Sindh as a candidate of PPP from Constituency PS-85 (Dadu-III) in 2018 Pakistani general election.

By Profession his source of income is  MPA Salary and Allowances, Rent, Share from Pir CNG near Hala district Matiari

References

Living people
Sindh MPAs 2013–2018
1978 births
Pakistan People's Party MPAs (Sindh)
Sindh MPAs 2018–2023
Alumni of the University of Kent